Moncef Dhouib (born 1952 in Sfax) is a Tunisian film director, actor, screenwriter and producer and puppeteer. He is a recipient of the FESPACO award. After making four notable short films in the 1980s he made The Sultan of the City (Soltane El Medina) (1993) and The TV arrives (Talfaza Jaya) (2006).

Selected filmography
Soltane El Medina (1993)
Les Siestes grenadine (1999)
Talfaza Jaya (2006)

References

Tunisian film directors
Tunisian male film actors
1952 births
Living people
People from Sfax
Tunisian screenwriters
Tunisian puppeteers